Alayin (also Romanized as ʿAlāyīn) is a village in Azimiyeh Rural District of the Central District of Ray County, Tehran province, Iran. At the 2006 National Census, its population was 24,179 in 6,221 households. The following census in 2011 counted 24,808 people in 7,235 households. The latest census in 2016 showed a population of 21,594 people in 6,579 households; it was the largest village in its rural district.

References 

Ray County, Iran

Populated places in Tehran Province

Populated places in Ray County, Iran